Jimmy Knepper in L.A. is an album led by trombonist Jimmy Knepper, recorded in 1977 and originally released in Japan on the Discomate label and in the United States on the Inner City label.

Reception 

The Allmusic review by Scott Yanow states: "These veterans have little difficulty coming up with fresh statements on the six familiar chord changes that they interpret. The hard-charging Tabackin matches very well with Knepper's sly trombone; they should have a rematch someday".

Track listing 
 "The Masher" (Jimmy Knepper) – 5:02
 "My Old Flame" (Sam Coslow, Arthur Johnston) – 4:57
 "Yesterdays" (Jerome Kern, Otto Harbach) – 8:23
 "Bertha the Dragoness" (Knepper) – 5:30
 "All the Things You Are" (Kern, Oscar Hammerstein II) – 10:30
 "Things Ain't What They Used to Be" (Mercer Ellington) – 6:23

Personnel 
Jimmy Knepper – trombone
Lew Tabackin – tenor saxophone, flute
Roger Kellaway – piano
Monty Budwig – bass
Shelly Manne – drums

References 

Jimmy Knepper albums
1978 albums
Inner City Records albums